Hovea pungens, commonly known as devil's pins, is a species of flowering plant in the family Fabaceae and is endemic to Western Australia. It is a small, upright shrub with dark green leaves and purple flowers.

Description
The branchlets thickly covered with a combination of straight, creased, flattened to spreading or upright hairs. The Noongar name for the plant is buyenak.

Taxonomy and naming
Hovea pungens was first formally described in 1837 by George Bentham and the description was published in Enumeratio plantarum quas in Novae Hollandiae ora austro-occidentali ad fluvium Cygnorum et in sinu Regis Georgii collegit Carolus Liber Baro de Hügel. The specific epithet (pungens) means "ending in a sharp, hard point" referring to the leaf.

Distribution and habitat
Devil's pins grows in shallow soils among granite, sandy and clay loams, outcrops, coastal limestone on flats, woodland, low heath and undulating sandplains.  The species has a distribution on the south west coast in the Wheatbelt, Peel, South West, Great Southern and Goldfields-Esperance regions of Western Australia.

References

pungens
Endemic flora of Western Australia
Fabales of Australia
Taxa named by George Bentham
Plants described in 1837